Michaël Llodra and Nenad Zimonjić were the defending champions, but Llodra chose not to compete this year.
Zimonjić played alongside Paul Hanley, but they lost to Bob and Mike Bryan in the quarterfinals, who won the tournament in the end against Marcel Granollers and Marc López 6–1, 4–6, [12–10].

Seeds
All seeds receive a bye into the second round.

Draw

Finals

Top half

Bottom half

References
General

Specific

2012 ATP World Tour
Men's Doubles